Merata Kawharu  is a New Zealand Māori writer and academic active in the New Zealand Historic Places Trust and the Māori Heritage Council. Her principal research is on the concept of kaitiakitanga (or guardianship) within Māori culture.

Affiliating to the Ngāti Whātua and Ngāpuhi iwi, she is the daughter of Sir Hugh Kawharu.

Academic career

After a Rhodes Scholarship took her to Oxford University for a PhD in anthropology, Kawharu returned to the New Zealand to posts at the universities of Auckland and Otago and roles with the United Nations, UNESCO, NZ Historic Places Trust Board and Māori Heritage Council. She is a principal investigator at Ngā Pae o te Māramatanga.

Kawharu is a member of the New Zealand Geographic Board.

In the 2012 New Year Honours, Kawharu was appointed a Member of the New Zealand Order of Merit, for services to Māori education.

References

External links
 Google Scholar 
 Linked-in

Living people
Academic staff of the University of Auckland
New Zealand women academics
New Zealand Māori academics
New Zealand writers
New Zealand women writers
Members of the New Zealand Order of Merit
Ngāti Whātua people
Ngāpuhi people
Māori studies academics
Year of birth missing (living people)
New Zealand Māori women academics
Academic staff of the University of Otago